The Stone of Claims ( in the Bavli, אבן הטועים in the Mishna and Yerushalmi)  (Even Hato'eem/n), also known as the Stone of Losses or Stone of Strayers, was a raised stone platform in Jerusalem mentioned in the Talmud.

History
According to the Talmud, the stone of claims was a public platform that existed in Jerusalem during the Second Temple period:

In 2015, archaeologists discovered a 2,000-year-old pyramid-shaped staircase built of large ashlar stones on an ancient street in the City of David. Some scholars have suggested  it might be the ancient Stone of Claims. The podium was found on the main street leading from the Siloam Pool to the Temple Mount.

Two British archaeologists who unearthed part of the step pyramid about a century ago thought it was a staircase leading to a house.

Literature

At the Stone of Losses is a book of poetry by T. Carmi.

See also
 Archaeology of Israel
 Jerusalem stone
 Temple in Jerusalem

References

Archaeological sites in Jerusalem
Ancient sites in Jerusalem